Robert "Bob" Hill (3 July 1867 – 3 October 1938) was a Scottish footballer who played primarily as a centre or inside forward.

Born in Forfar, Scotland, Hill began his football career when he was a soldier and was spotted playing for his regimental team, Black Watch. After a brief spell at Glentoran, it was Irish League rivals Linfield who bought him out of his army contract and took him on as a player. Hill spent three successful seasons with the Belfast club, winning two Irish Cup and two League Champions medals with them.

On February 1893, Hill arrived at Sheffield United, scoring on his debut as a trialist and prompting United to sign him permanently. He soon established himself in United's first team and played in the 1893 test–match victory that saw them promoted to the First Division. Hill was a regular in the side for the following two seasons and despite starting the 1895–96 season as a first-choice striker, he was surprisingly transferred to Ardwick in November 1895 along with Joe Davies and Hugh Morris.

After two years at Ardwick, Hill spent a brief period with Watford St. Marys in 1898, before joining Millwall (1898–99) and then Brighton United (1899–1900). Then, Hill returned to his native Scotland to play for Dundee and finished his career with his home town club Forfar Athletic.

Honours
Sheffield United
Football League Division Two
Runner-up: 1892–93

References

1867 births
1938 deaths
People from Forfar
Black Watch soldiers
Scottish footballers
Association football forwards
NIFL Premiership players
English Football League players
Scottish Football League players
Glentoran F.C. players
Linfield F.C. players
Sheffield United F.C. players
Manchester City F.C. players
Millwall F.C. players
Brighton United F.C. players
Dundee F.C. players
Forfar Athletic F.C. players
Footballers from Angus, Scotland